Andrei Dmitriyevich Vasilyev (born 11 February 1992) is a Russian professional football player who plays for Neman Grodno.

Career
He made his Russian Premier League debut for FC Rostov on 11 March 2012 in a game against FC Krylia Sovetov Samara.

References

External links
 
 
 

1992 births
Footballers from Saint Petersburg
Living people
Russian footballers
Russia youth international footballers
Russia under-21 international footballers
Association football defenders
Russian expatriate footballers
Expatriate footballers in Belarus
Russian Premier League players
FC Zenit Saint Petersburg players
FC Rostov players
FC Dynamo Saint Petersburg players
FC Arsenal Tula players
FC Zenit-2 Saint Petersburg players
FC Chayka Peschanokopskoye players
FC Torpedo Minsk players
FC Gomel players
FC Neman Grodno players